Sapropel (a contraction of ancient Greek words sapros and pelos, meaning putrefaction and mud (or clay), respectively) is a term used in marine geology to describe dark-coloured sediments that are rich in organic matter. Organic carbon concentrations in sapropels commonly exceed 2 wt.% in weight.

The term sapropel events may also refer to cyclic oceanic anoxic event (OAE), in particular those affecting the Mediterranean Sea with a periodicity of about 21,000 years.

Formation
Sapropels have been recorded in the Mediterranean sediments since the closure of the Eastern Tethys Ocean 13.5 million years ago. The formation of sapropel events in the Mediterranean Sea occurs approximately every 21,000 years and last between 3,000 and 5,000 years. The first identification of these events occurred in the mid-20th century. Since then, their formulative conditions of have been investigated.

The occurrence of sapropels has been related to the Earth's orbital parameters (Milankovitch cycles). The precession cycles influence the African monsoon, which influences the Mediterranean circulation through increases in freshwater inputs.

Sapropels develop during episodes of reduced oxygen availability in bottom waters, such as an oceanic anoxic event (OAE). Most studies of formational mechanisms infer some degree of reduced deep-water circulation. Oxygen can only reach the deep sea by new deep-water formation and consequent "ventilation" of deep basins. There are two main causes of OAE: reduction in deep-water circulation or raised oxygen demand from upper level.

A reduction in deep-water circulation will eventually lead to a serious decrease in deep-water oxygen concentrations due to biochemical oxygen demand associated with the decay of organic matter. This sinks into the deep sea as a result of export production from surface waters. Oxygen depletion in bottom waters then favors the enhanced preservation of the  organic matter during burial by the sediments. Organic-rich sediments may also form in well-ventilated settings that have highly productive surface waters; here the high surface demand simply extracts the oxygen before it can enter the deep circulation current thus depriving the bottom waters of oxygen.

Significance
Sapropelic deposits from global ocean anoxic events form important oil source rocks. Detailed process studies of sapropel formation have concentrated on the fairly recent eastern Mediterranean deposits, the last of which occurred between 9.5 and 5.5 thousand years ago.

The Mediterranean sapropels of the Pleistocene reflect increased density stratification in the isolated Mediterranean basin. They record a higher organic carbon concentration than non-sapropel times; an increase in the δ15N and corresponding decrease in δ13C tells of rising productivity as a result of nitrogen fixation. This effect is more pronounced further east in the basin, suggesting that increased precipitation was most pronounced at that end of the sea.

Non-conventional source of energy 
Bulgarian Professor Petko Dimitrov is the creator of the idea for the application of sapropel sediments from the bottom of the Black Sea as a natural ecological fertilizer and biological products. According to the Romanian tycoon Dinu Patriciu, the sapropel sediments have the potential to be a source of non-conventional energy.
Patriciu has created a marine exploration project in the Black Sea which examines the sapropel sediments of that region. Sediment cores are collected and investigated by several universities and research institutes across the world.

See also
 Pelite, mud rocks

References

External links
"Using the material choking Russian lakes for sustainable water technologies" discusses uses for sapropel

Marine geology
Sediments
Geochemistry
Mineralogy